Texas Tech University, often referred to as Texas Tech or TTU, is a public, coeducational, research university in Lubbock, Texas, United States. Texas Tech offers 150 bachelor's, 104 master's, and 59 doctoral degree programs through 11 academic colleges, a graduate school and a school of law.

Colleges and schools

Current
Initially Texas Technological College was separated into four schools: Agriculture, Engineering, Home Economics, and Liberal Arts. In 1933 they were designated as divisions before reverting to schools in 1944. Graduate education began in 1927 within the School of Liberal Arts before a separate Division of Graduate Studies opened in 1935 and renamed as the Graduate School in 1954. A Division of Commerce was formed in 1942; by 1956 it had become the School of Business Administration. The School of Law and the School of Education opened in 1967. In an answer to alumni, faculty, and student opinion to better describe the institution's growth, the legislature changed the name of Texas Technological College to Texas Tech University on September 1, 1969. Five of the six schools became colleges with only the School of Law retaining its name.

Former
 University College, 2008–2012. Formerly named "College of Outreach and Distance Education" (2008–2010), and "Division of Outreach & Distance Education" prior to 2008.

Research

Classified by the Carnegie Foundation as a research university with "high activity", Texas Tech University hosts 60 research centers and institutes.

Resources

Press

References

External links
Texas Tech University Official Site

Texas Tech University
Texas Tech University